Kessenich is a village in the Belgian province Limburg. It is a section of the municipality of Kinrooi, lying in the eastern end of the municipality.

Geography
Kessenich is the end of the Grensmaas, the part of the Meuse who forms a natural border with the Dutch province Limburg. This river separates Kessenich from Stevensweert. In the north lie the Dutch villages of Thorn, Ittervoort and Neeritter. In the south lies Maaseik. The region of Kessenich is dissected by several rivers: the Abeek, the Itterbeek and Witbeek on their way to the Meuse.

East of Kessenich is an area with several ponds, the Maasplassen. They were created by large-scale exploitation of gravel from 1949. The gravel layer with a thickness of up to 10 m, was deposited by the Meuse, which repeatedly moved to the east. In May 2008 ended the gravel mining and began the partial attenuation of the lakes. Now, some Maasplassen are equipped for recreation or nature.

Name
Its name is derived from the Gallo-Roman Cassiniacum. Kessenich is also named as Kesnic (1102), Kasnech (1132), Casselin or Cassenic (1155), Kessenich (1219) and Cessenic (1224). Later, it's also identified on maps as Kessingen (1573) and Kesnick (1754). In Limburgish it's still called 'Kesing'.

History
Kessenich is the oldest of the five villages of Kinrooi. It was founded as a Celtic settlement, then close to the Meuse. That has been shifted to the east and left north of the village a bogged arm behind. This marsh, the Vijverbroek, made in the Middle age as redoubt. According to a legend had between Kessenich and Thorn drowned the village Vijvere. Now it is a unique area overgrown with alder and other tree and plant species.

Remains of a prehistoric settlement have been found on the Boterakker, southern of the village. Other prehistoric finds have been made on the Hezerheide, western of the village. There were also found Roman catacombs (Molenwegske) and a Roman road (near the limit). This Roman road connected Maastricht and Nijmegen and had here a width of 12 m.
 
After the destruction of the Western Roman Empire there has been formed a shire, extending Kessnich, Thorn, Aldeneik and some other villages. Ansfried of Utrecht might have been the last count of this area, because in that period the shire suddenly fall apart. Finally, the area was divided into three parts; Thorn, Aldeneik and Kessenich. Thorn and Aldeneik became important abbeys, Kessenich was lying between both. So there was a major influence of those abbeys. Kessenich became an imperial free city, since the 14th century united with the county Bronshorn (Hunsel).
 
The county of Kessenich was governed out of a Motte-and-bailey, built as protection against the pillaging Vikings, who even Maastricht, Tongeren and Aachen have reached via the Meuse, and the many floods of the Meuse. From the tower on the 10 meters high artificial hill are ruins remaining. The new castle has been built in the 17th century, by the family Van Waes. The hamlet where the castle is, lies nearby Neeritter, so it's called Borgitter. 
 
In the 18th century was Kessenich like whole Limburg the battlefield of the various wars. When the Dutch-British troops withdrew from the region under the leadership of the Duke of Malborough during the Spanish Succession War, Kessenich was plundered in 1714, besieged the castle and the countess captured. In the whole region is still the annually tradition to burn a straw doll, which the Duke of Marlborough should propose.

In 1795, the French annexed also Kessenich and divided it into the department Meuse-Inférieure. The estates of the counts Van Waes were sold by the Frenchmen to the family Michiels. One of their descendants was Willem Michiels of Kessenich, who was mayor of Maastricht from 1937 till 1967. After Napoleon's defeat with the Battle of Waterloo, all countries of the Benelux were united into the United Kingdom of the Netherlands and the department became the Province of Limburg. The anthem of this province is written in Neeritter. In 1839, the province is divided with de Meuse as limit into a Belgian and a Dutch part.

References

Former polities in the Netherlands
Former municipalities of Limburg (Belgium)
Kinrooi
Populated places in Limburg (Belgium)